Thevaram is a town in Theni district in the Indian state of Tamil Nadu. Thevaram is located in Tamil Nadu near on border of Kerala at the Eastern side foot-hill of the Western Ghats. It is connected with State Highway SH100.

Farming is main occupation of this Village

Demographics
 census, Thevaram had a population of 16,079. Males constitute 49.64% of the population and females 50.36%. Thevaram has an average literacy rate of 69.56%, higher than the national average of 59.5%: male literacy is 75.68%, and female literacy is 63.53%. In Thevaram, 9% of the population is under 6 years of age.

Total number of households: 4225

 India Tamil Nadu theni district census, Thevaram had a population of 14,501. Males constitute 50% of the population and females 50%. Thevaram has an average literacy rate of 66%, higher than the national average of 59.5%: male literacy is 74%, and female literacy is 59%. In Thevaram, 10% of the population is under 6 years of age.

References

Cities and towns in Theni district